William Richards Adrion is a computer scientist and Professor Emeritus at University of Massachusetts Amherst. He was named an ACM Fellow in 1996 and elected a fellow of the American Association for the Advancement of Science in 1995. He was a founding member and the first Editor-in-Chief of the ACM Transactions on Software Engineering and Methodology, and was also a founding member of the Computing Research Association.

References 

Fellows of the American Association for the Advancement of Science
Fellows of the Association for Computing Machinery
Living people
Year of birth missing (living people)